Hofii is a form of female vocal folk music that is believed to have originated from Tlemcen, Algeria. It is known to have existed from the 14th-century, when it was mentioned by Ibn Khaldun in his work Muqaddimah. It is often sung to the accompaniment of a lute.

External links
 Music of Algeria: Selected Recordings

Algerian music